Žiga Frelih (born 6 February 1998) is a Slovenian professional footballer who plays as a goalkeeper for Spanish club Mirandés.

Club career 
Frelih is a youth product of Bravo, and began his senior career in the Slovenian third division in 2015. He was later the reserve goalkeeper at Celje and Domžale. Frelih transferred to Krško in 2017, and made his first senior appearance with them in a 0–0 Slovenian Football Cup tie with Ilirija 1911 on 16 August 2017. He made his top division debut for Krško in a 1–0 loss to Olimpija Ljubljana on 8 April 2018.

In 2019, Frelih moved to Croatian club Inter Zaprešić. There, he scored his first goal of his career in a 2–2 draw with Istra on 4 October 2019 in the 92nd minute of the game. After earning his spot as a starter there, he returned to Slovenia and signed with Olimpija Ljubljana in August 2020. He stayed at the club for one year, before his contract was terminated in July 2021 due to alleged violation of disciplinary rules.

In September 2021, Frelih signed a three-year contract with Primeira Liga side Gil Vicente. On 1 August 2022, he was loaned to Chaves, but left the club late in the month due to personal problems, and subsequently rescinded his contract with Gil Vicente.

On 3 February 2023, Frelih moved to Spain and was announced at Segunda División side Mirandés.

International career
Frelih was a youth international for Slovenia, having represented the Slovenia under-21 team. He was called-up to train with the senior team in March 2021.

Honours
Domžale
Slovenian Cup: 2016–17

Olimpija Ljubljana
Slovenian Cup: 2020–21

References

External links
 
 NZS profile 

1998 births
Living people
Footballers from Ljubljana
Slovenian footballers
Slovenia under-21 international footballers
Association football goalkeepers
NK Bravo players
NK Celje players
NK Domžale players
NK Krško players
NK Inter Zaprešić players
NK Olimpija Ljubljana (2005) players
Gil Vicente F.C. players
G.D. Chaves players
CD Mirandés footballers
Slovenian PrvaLiga players
Croatian Football League players
Primeira Liga players

Slovenian expatriate footballers
Slovenian expatriate sportspeople in Croatia
Expatriate footballers in Croatia
Slovenian expatriate sportspeople in Portugal
Expatriate footballers in Portugal
Slovenian expatriate sportspeople in Spain
Expatriate footballers in Spain